Sometimes followed by another word, such as Poster or Posting, an Illegal Handbill is one that violates laws or codes regarding
use of a public place to advertise.

A handbill includes any sign, notice, placard, poster, paper, advertising circular, sticker, card, leaflet, or other similar item calculated to attract the attention of the public.

Examples of Restrictions
Although the precise wording may vary from place to place, an example of applicable regulations is:

 "No person shall post, affix, ... attach ... upon any street lamp, street sign, ... utility poll ...

Enforcement
 Fines 
 Combatting posters for upcoming events by marking them CANCELLED 
 have government workers tear them down 
 Business loss

Legal alternative
 Permitting posting on a limited basis, e.g. bulletin boards  provides another outlet for the distribution of the information.  
 Unity - "Workshop to Create Single Handbill"

See also
 Guerrilla marketing
 Martin v. City of Struthers

External links
 http://www.altterrain.com/wild-postings-poster-outdoor-advertising-company-new-york-los-angeles-chicago
 http://delandenterprises.blogspot.com/2007/06/mesquite-texas-handbill-law_07.html

References

Advertising